Stenocarpus verticis is a species of flowering plant in the family Proteaceae and is endemic to northern Australia. It is a tree with elliptic or lance-shaped adult leaves and groups of cream-coloured flowers covered with woolly, rust-coloured or grey hairs.

Description
Stenocarpus verticis is a tree that typically grows to a height of up to  but sometimes flowers and forms fruit when still a shrub. Its young growth is covered with rusty or grey, silky hairs.

Taxonomy
Stenocarpus verticis was first formally described in 1995 by Donald Bruce Foreman in the Flora of Australia from specimens collected by Glenn Wightman and Clyde Dunlop near Gunn Point in 1984. The specific epithet (verticis) refers to the "top end", referring to the distribution of this species.

Distribution and habitat
This species grows in rainforest or in monsoon thicket and occurs from Melville Island to the Gove Peninsula in the Northern Territory and on Cape York Peninsula in Queensland.

References

Flora of the Northern Territory
Flora of Queensland
verticis
Plants described in 1995